
 
Watnall railway station was a station serving the village of Watnall in Nottinghamshire, England. The station opened in 1882 and closed in 1917. It was sited at the eastern end of the railway cutting used to provide the Midland Railway with a route through to Kimberley.

The cutting still exists although it is heavily overgrown. Remnants of the platform can be found beneath the undergrowth, but the buildings are no longer in existence. A bunker was built on this site for RAF Watnall during the Second World War and used as an operations centre for No. 12 Group RAF. The headquarters moved to RAF Newton in 1946, but the bunker remained in use for the duration of the ROTOR program and was mothballed in 1961. The bunker was used as a rifle range by the Awsworth - Kimberley and District Rifle Club.

In May 2010, local police discovered a large cannabis factory inside the bunker.

See also 
 Kimberley East railway station
 Kimberley West railway station

References

Further reading

External links
 

Disused railway stations in Nottinghamshire
Former Midland Railway stations
Railway stations in Great Britain opened in 1882
Railway stations in Great Britain closed in 1917